Museum of Decorative Arts or Decorative Arts Museum or in French Musée des Arts Décoratifs are museums which present collections of Decorative Arts. There are numerous museums :

Non-exhaustive list of Decorative Arts Museums

Europe 
 Musée des Arts Décoratifs, Paris, France
 Musée des Arts Décoratifs et du Design, Bordeaux, France
 Musée des Arts décoratifs, Strasbourg, France
 Musée des Tissus et des Arts décoratifs, Lyon, France
 Latvian Museum of Decorative Arts and Design, Riga, Latvia
 Museum of Decorative Arts, Berlin (Kunstgewerbemuseum Berlin), Germany
 Museum of Decorative Arts in Prague (Uměleckoprůmyslové museum v Praze), Czech Republic
 National Museum of Ireland – Decorative Arts and History, Dublin, Ireland
 Norwegian Museum of Decorative Arts and Design, Oslo, Norway

North America 

 DeWitt Wallace Decorative Arts Museum, Williamsburg, Virginia
 Kirkland Museum of Fine & Decorative Art, Denver, Colorado
 Villa Terrace Decorative Arts Museum, Milwaukee, Wisconsin

South America 
 Firma y Odilo Estévez Municipal Decorative Art Museum, Rosario, Argentina
 National Museum of Decorative Arts, Buenos Aires, Argentina
 Museum of Decorative Arts, Havana (Museo de Artes Decorativas), Cuba

See also 
 Museum of Arts (disambiguation)
 Boncompagni Ludovisi Decorative Art Museum, Rome, Italy
 Danish Museum of Art & Design (formerly Danish Museum of Decorative Art), Copenhagen, Denmark
 Les Arts Décoratifs, Paris, France